Singur Assembly constituency is an assembly constituency in Hooghly district in the Indian state of West Bengal.

Overview
As per orders of the Delimitation Commission, No. 188 Singur Assembly constituency is composed of the following: Anandanagore, Bagdanga Chinamore, Baruipara Paltagarh, Beraberi, Bighati, Bouichipota, Bora, Borai Pahalampur, Gopalnagore, Mirzapur-Bankipur, Nasibpur, Singur I and Singur II gram panchayats of Singur  community development block and Begampur, Kapasaria and Panchghora gram panchayats of Chanditala II community development block.

Singur Assembly constituency is part of No. 28 Hooghly (Lok Sabha constituency).

Members of Legislative Assembly

Election results

2021

2016

2011

 
  

.# Swing calculated on Congress+Trinamool Congress vote percentages taken together in 2006.

1977-2006
In the 2006 and 2001 state assembly elections, Rabindranath Bhattacharya of Trinamool Congress won the Singur assembly seat defeating his nearest rivals, Srikanta Chattopadhyay of CPI(M) and Bidyut Kumar Das of CPI(M) respectively. Contests in most years were multi cornered but only winners and runners are being mentioned. Bidyut Kumar Das of CPI(M) defeated Dwijaprosad Bhattacharya of Congress in 1996, Chandra Sekhar Back of Congress in 1991 and Tarapada Sadhukhan of Congress in 1987. Tarapada Sadhukhan of Congress defeated Gopal Bandopadhyay of CPI(M) in 1982. Gopal Bandopadhyay of CPI(M) defeated Tarapada Sadhukhan of Congress in 1977.

1951-1972
Ajit Kumar Basu of CPI won in 1972 and 1971. Gopal Bandopadhyay of CPI(M) won in 1969. Provaakar Pal of Congress won in 1967, 1962 and 1957. In independent India's first election in 1951 Singoor (as spelt then) had a double seat. It was won by Sourendra Nath Saha and Ajit Kumar Basu, both of CPI.

References

Assembly constituencies of West Bengal
Politics of Hooghly district